The 61st Bodil Awards were held on 24 February 2008 in Imperial Cinema in Copenhagen, Denmark, honouring the best national and foreign films of 1007. Louise Mieritz and Ditte Hansen hosted the event. The Art of Crying won the awards for Best Film and Best Actor (Jesper Asholt). Noomi Rapace won the award for Best Actress for her performance in Daisy Diamond.

Winners

Best Danish Film 
 The Art of Crying
 AFR
 Fightgirl Ayse
 White Night

Best Actor in a Leading Role 
 Jesper Asholt -The Art of Crying
 Kim Bodnia – Ekko
 Lars Brygmann – White Night
 David Dencik – Uden for kærligheden
 Jannik Lorenzen – The Art of Crying

Best Actress in a Leading Role 
 Noomi Rapace – Daisy Diamond
 Rikke Louise Andersson – White Night
 Sonja Richter – Cecilie
 Paprika Steen – The Substitute
 Semra Turan – Fightgirl Ayse

Best Actor in a Supporting Role 
 Morten Grunwald – White Night
 Dejan Čukić – De unge år
 Nicolaj Kopernikus – De fortabte sjæles ø
 Søren Malling – De unge år
 Cyron Melville – Fightgirl Ayse

Best Actress in a Supporting Role 
 Charlotte Fich – Just Another Love Story
 Anne Sophie Byder – White Night
 Stine Fischer Christensen – Ekko
 Trine Dyrholm – Daisy Diamond
 Hanne Hedelund – The Art of Crying

Best American Film 
 Letters from Iwo Jima
 The Darjeeling Limited
 I'm Not There
 Paranoid Park
 Zodiac

Best Non-American Film 
 Pan's Labyrinth
 4 Months, 3 Weeks and 2 Days
 Eastern Promises
 Persepolis
 Reprise

Best Cinematographer 
 Dan Laustsen for The Substitute and Just Another Love Story

Best Documentary Film 
 The Monastery

Bodil Special Award 
 Ghost Digital Production House for effects in Island of Lost Souls''

Bodil Honorary Award 
 Ib Monty, Margurete Engberg, and Nils Jensen

See also 

 2008 Robert Awards

References 

2007 film awards
Bodil Awards ceremonies
2008 in Copenhagen
February 2008 events in Europe